Courage & Patience & Grit is a DVD/CD set released by the band Great Big Sea on November 14, 2006. It contains video of the live performance from a concert at the Empire Theatre in Belleville, Ontario along with music videos for the songs "Captain Kidd", "When I Am King", "Lukey", and "Shines Right Through Me". The live performance was recorded during their The Hard and the Easy tour.

The name of the album comes from a line in the song "Tickle Cove Pond" ("It's only by courage and patience and grit"), a song on The Hard and the Easy, which provides the name for that album but which does not appear on this DVD.

Track listing 

 "Captain Kidd" (Traditional, Arranged Alan Doyle, Séan McCann, Bob Hallett) – 2:56
 "Jack Hinks" (Traditional) – 4:08
 "Sweet Forget Me Not (Graceful and Charming)"(Bobby Newcome, Arranged Alan Doyle, Séan McCann, Bob Hallett) – 3:24
 "Billy Peddle" – (Traditional) 4:34
 "Concerning Charlie Horse" (Omar Blondahl) – 3:40
 * "I’m A Rover" (Traditional) 3:32
 "A Boat Like Gideon Brown" (Traditional, Arranged Alan Doyle, Séan McCann, Bob Hallett, Darrell Power) – 3:20
 "The Mermaid" (Shel Silverstein, Arranged Alan Doyle, Séan McCann, Bob Hallett) – 3:59
 "The River Driver" (Traditional, Arranged Alan Doyle, Séan McCann, Bob Hallett) – 3:20
 "Scolding Wife" (Traditional Arranged By Alan Doyle, Séan McCann, Bob Hallett, Darrell Power) – 3:59
 "Old Polina" (Traditional, Arranged Alan Doyle, Séan McCann, Bob Hallett) – 2:34
 "Shines Right Through Me" (Alan Doyle, Kalem Mahoney, Séan McCann) – 3:17
 "When I’m Up" (Ian Telfer, Alan Prosser, John Jones) – 4:19
 "The Night Pat Murphy Died" (Johnny Burke) – 3:37
 "When I Am King" (Alan Doyle) – 2:48
 * "Danny Boy" (Traditional) 3:01
 * "Run Runaway" (Noddy Holder, Jim Lea) 3:30
 "General Taylor" (Arranged By Alan Doyle, Séan McCann, Bob Hallett, Darrell Power) – 3:33
 "Sea Of No Cares" (Alan Doyle, Séan McCann, Chris Trapper) – 4:15
 "Helmet Head" (Bob Hallett) – 3:00
 "Consequence Free" (Alan Doyle, Séan McCann, Bob Hallett, Darrell Power) – 3:23
 "Mari-Mac" (Arranged By Alan Doyle, Séan McCann, Bob Hallett, Darrell Power) – 3:25
 "Ordinary Day" (Alan Doyle, Séan McCann) – 4:40
 "Excursion Around The Bay" (Johnny Burke) – 2:41
 "Fortune Set" (Arranged By Alan Doyle, Séan McCann, Bob Hallett, Darrell Power) – 3:15
 * "Old Brown’s Daughter" (Traditional) 2:48

 Tracks marked with an asterisk not available on the audio CD.

Personnel 

Eric Beausejour – Design
Chris Butler – Photography
Yves Dion – Editing
Alan Doyle – Guitar (Acoustic), Bouzouki, Guitar (Electric), Liner Notes
Murray Foster – Bass, Vocals
Bob Hallett – Fiddle, Liner Notes, Tin Whistle, Button Accordion, Tenor Banjo
François Lamoureux – Liner Notes, Mixing
Pierre Lamoureux – Director, Liner Notes
Kris MacFarlane – Guitar (Acoustic), Percussion, Drums, Vocals, Piano-Accordion
Andrew MacNaughtan – Photography
Séan McCann – Guitar (Acoustic), Vocals, Liner Notes, Bodhran, Shaker, Tin Whistle
John McCullagh – Scratching
Denis Normandeau – Mixing

References

Great Big Sea albums
2006 compilation albums
2006 video albums
2006 live albums
Live video albums